Iniesta may refer to:

 Iniesta (surname)
 Iniesta (leafhopper), an insect genus in the tribe Dikraneurini
 Iniesta, Cuenca, a municipality in Spain
 Castillejo de Iniesta, a municipality in Spain
 Graja de Iniesta, a municipality in Spain
 Andrés Iniesta, Spanish football player
 Iniesta (footballer, born 1992)